Knœrsheim is a commune in the Bas-Rhin department in Grand Est in north-eastern France.

Geography
Surrounding communes are Zeinheim and Rangen to the south-east, Zehnacker in the south and Westhouse-Marmoutier to the north-west

See also
 Communes of the Bas-Rhin department

References

Communes of Bas-Rhin
Bas-Rhin communes articles needing translation from French Wikipedia